Dungeon Twister is a strategy board game with a fantasy theme. Dungeon Twister was created by Christophe Boelinger, who published other French games such as Halloween Party, A Dog's Life, and Snowboard. Dungeon Twister was originally printed in French and has gained popularity worldwide with English and German releases.

History
The Dungeon Twister Basic Set was produced in France in 2004 by Asmodée Éditions. It was again produced in 2005 in the U.S., also by Asmodée. In November 2009, Asmodée and Hydravision Entertainment together announced that a video game adaptation of the game would be released in Q3 2009 for Xbox 360 via Xbox Live Arcade. In May 2012, it was announced that the Xbox 360 had been dropped in favor of PlayStation 3, with a new release slated for Q2/Q3 2012 via PlayStation Network. In late June 2012, the final release date of 3 July 2012 was announced. Boellinger stated that he liked the game, but the game saw very negative reception from critics.

On April 14, 2014, a crowdfunding project launched on Ulule, in order to make the adaptation of the game on tablets and smartphones.

Editions
Appeared in French, English and German:
 Basegame
 Paladins & Dragons
 3/4-Players
 Forces of Darkness
 Prison

Just in French and English:
 Mercenaires
 Fire and Water

Just in French:
 Fire and Blood (A feu & à sang)
 Forest creatures (Créatures Sylvestres)
 Iceearth (Terres de Glace)

Tournaments

World cup
 2012 :  Ansgar Ludwig
 2011 :  Christian Freidl
 2010 :  Christian Freidl
 2009 :  Fabrice Wiels
 2008 :  Florian Vacheresse
 2007 :  Mickaël Bonnefoy
 2006 :  Florian Vacheresse

Three nations cup
 2011 :  Saskia Ruth
 2010 :  Jan Oliver Noll
 2009 :  Fabrice Wiels
 2008 :  Pierre Schomus

German championship
 2013 :  Brian Zeltsch
 2012 :  Jérôme Jambert
 2011 :  Xavier Heeren
 2010 :  Mario Krone
 2009 :  Pierre Schomus

Belgian championship
 2010 :  Saskia Ruth
 2009 :  Pierre Schomus
 2008 :  Saskia Ruth
 2007 :  Nicolas Buckens
 2006 :  François Sansot

French championship
 2011 :  Alexandre Bern
 2010 :  Xavier Heeren
 2009 :  Illia Racunica
 2008 :  Arnaud Fresnel
 2007 :  Florian Vacheresse
 2006 :  Christophe André
 2005 :  Illia Racunica

The first three positions of the annual LIDT rankings

Reviews
Pyramid

References

External links
 Website of the Game 
 Website of LIDT

 Dungeon Twister at luding.org

Board games introduced in 2004
Fantasy board games
French board games
Board games with a modular board